Bob McDonogh  (March 5, 1900, San Francisco, California – December 10, 1945, Columbus, Ohio) was an American racecar driver. McDonogh made 38 starts in AAA Championship racing from 1924 through 1932. Most of McDonogh's career was during the board track era. Outside of Indianapolis, he only made two starts on tracks that weren't board tracks, both at Syracuse. McDonogh won three races on board tracks during the 1925 AAA Championship season, at (Culver City; Altoona and Laurel, Maryland). He finished the 1925 season ranked 4th in points. McDonogh did stunt work for movies and later worked as an airplane mechanic.

Indianapolis 500 results

References

Indianapolis 500 drivers
1900 births
1945 deaths
AAA Championship Car drivers
Sportspeople from Altoona, Pennsylvania
Racing drivers from Pennsylvania